GTCS may refer to:

 Generalized tonic–clonic seizure, a type of seizure
 General Teaching Council for Scotland